This list presents a selection of journals in the field of psychology and its branches.

A

 Acta Psychologica
 Adaptive Behavior
 Adultspan Journal
 Aggressive Behavior
 Aging and Mental Health
 American Behavioral Scientist American Journal of Psychology American Psychologist Annual Review of Clinical Psychology Annual Review of Psychology Applied Psychological Measurement Archives of Scientific Psychology Archives of Sexual Behavior Archives of Suicide Research Asian Journal of Social Psychology Athletic Insight: The Online Journal of Sport PsychologyBBasic and Applied Social PsychologyBehavior TherapyBehavioral and Brain FunctionsBehavioral and Brain SciencesBritish Journal of Clinical PsychologyBritish Journal of Developmental PsychologyBritish Journal of Mathematical and Statistical PsychologyBritish Journal of PsychologyBritish Journal of Social PsychologyC

 Canadian Journal of Behavioural Science Canadian Journal of Experimental Psychology Canadian Journal of School Psychology Canadian Psychology Cerebral Cortex Clinical Psychological Science The Coaching Psychologist Cognition Cognitive Neuropsychology Consciousness and Cognition Consulting Psychology Journal: Practice and Research Couple and Family Psychology Cultic Studies Review Cultural Diversity and Ethnic Minority Psychology Current Directions in Psychological Science Clinical Psychology ReviewDDevelopmental PsychologyDevelopmental ScienceE

 Ecopsychology Emotion Emotion Review European Journal of Personality European Journal of Psychology of Education European Journal of Social Psychology European Journal of Work and Organizational Psychology European Psychologist European Review of Social Psychology Evolution and Human Behavior Evolutionary Psychology Experimental PsychologyF
 Families, Systems and HealthG

 Group Processes and Intergroup RelationsH
 Health PsychologyI

 Intellectica The International Journal for the Psychology of Religion The International Journal of Aviation Psychology The International Journal of Psychoanalysis International Journal of Psychology International Journal of Stress Management International Journal of Transgenderism International Perspectives in Psychology: Research, Practice, Consultation International Review of Sport and Exercise PsychologyJ

 Japanese Psychological Research Journal of Abnormal Child Psychology Journal of Abnormal Psychology Journal of the American Psychoanalytic Association Journal of Applied Behavior Analysis Journal of Applied Psychology Journal of Applied Social Psychology Journal of Cognitive Neuroscience Journal of Community and Applied Social Psychology Journal of Consciousness Studies Journal of Consulting and Clinical PsychologyJournal of Contextual Behavioral Science
 Journal of European Psychology Students Journal of Economic Psychology Journal of the Experimental Analysis of Behavior Journal of Experimental Psychology: General Journal of Experimental Psychology: Human Perception and Performance Journal of Experimental Psychology: Learning, Memory and Cognition Journal of Experimental Psychology: Animal Learning and Cognition Journal of Experimental Psychology: Applied Journal of Environmental Psychology Journal of Experimental Psychopathology Journal of Happiness Studies Journal of Health Psychology Journal of Homosexuality Journal of Humanistic Psychology The Journal of Individual Psychology Journal of Mind and Behavior Journal of Nervous and Mental Disease Journal of Neuropsychology Journal of Nonverbal Behavior Journal of Occupational and Organizational Psychology Journal of Occupational Health Psychology Journal of Personality and Social Psychology The Journal of Positive Psychology The Journal of Psychology Journal of Reproductive and Infant Psychology Journal of Research in Personality Journal of Sex & Marital Therapy Journal of Sex Research Journal of Theoretical and Philosophical Psychology Journal of Vision Journal of Work and Organizational PsychologyL
 L'Année PsychologiqueM
 Mind & Language Mindfulness Music PerceptionN
 New Ideas in PsychologyP
 Perception Perceptual and Motor Skills Personal Relationships Personality and Individual Differences Personality and Social Psychology Bulletin Personality and Social Psychology Review Perspectives on Psychological Science Philosophical Psychology Professional Psychology: Research and Practice Psyche Psychological Assessment Psychological Bulletin Psychological Inquiry Psychological Medicine Psychological Methods Psychological Reports Psychological Review Psychological Science Psychological Science in the Public Interest Psychological Studies Psychology & Developing Societies Psychology and Psychotherapy: Theory, Research and Practice Psychology of Addictive Behaviors Psychology of Aesthetics, Creativity, and the Arts Psychology of Men and Masculinity Psychology of Music Psychology of Religion and Spirituality Psychology of Women Quarterly Psychology, Public Policy, and Law PsychometrikaQ
 Quality & QuantityR
 Review of General Psychology Review of Philosophy and PsychologyS

 Sex Roles Social Cognition Social Psychological and Personality Science Social Psychology Social Psychology Quarterly Spirituality in Clinical Practice Suicide and Life-Threatening BehaviorT

 Teaching of Psychology Theory & Psychology Trends in Cognitive SciencesU

 Universitas PsychologicaW

 Work & Stress''

External links
 Electronic journals and periodicals in psychology and related fields
 The DOAJ list of psychology open access journals

Journals
 
Psychology